APO Atalanti Football Club is a Greek football club based in Atalanti, Phthiotis, Greece.

Honors

Domestic

 Phthiotis FCA Champions: 2
 1991–92, 2018-19
 Phthiotis FCA Cup Winners: 3
 1992–93, 1995–96, 2018-19

References

Phthiotis
Association football clubs established in 1968
1968 establishments in Greece
Gamma Ethniki clubs